Throne of a Thousand Years is a non-fiction book by author Jacob Truedson Demitz, first published in 1996 as the first English-language historical account solely about all the kings and queens of Sweden. and again as Centuries of Selfies in 2020.

It details their personal histories, the impact of their reigns on Scandinavian history, and the political implications of disclosed dynastic ties in Europe.

Sponsored mainly by Ericsson, ABB and the Swedish Postal Service, the 1996 account was published by Ristesson Ent in Ludvika and Los Angeles. A fictional chronicler called Erik, Son of Riste related the factual story, followed by fact boxes about each of the 66 monarchs covered and a number of ancestry charts. Illustrations in that early version (if not otherwise noted in the book) are portrait drawings by the author made from the 1960s to the 1990s, and 3 differently sorted lists of persons were included as well as an appended text rendition in Swedish.

Reception 

Throne of a Thousand Years was particularly praised by Dala-Demokraten for its English-language name forms, exonyms for pre-20th-century Swedish royalty, and a "refreshing" lack of nationalism, and by Nya Ludvika Tidning for its general interest and for easy access to hard-to-find facts.

2020 edition

Making extensive use of recent donations by the National Museum of Sweden to Wikimedia Commons, and crediting that museum for them, a new full color edition called Centuries of Selfies was published in 2020 with a preface by Ulf Sundberg. In the updated version's historical account, Erik, Son of Riste has been excluded, whereas comprehensive new chapters covering the royal dynasties and burials, respectively, have been added to the book.

External links 
 LIBRIS listing, National Library of Sweden

References 

1996 non-fiction books
Swedish monarchy
2020 non-fiction books
English-language books